October 6 University (O6U) is a private university located in Giza, 6th of October City, Egypt. It was established by the Republican Decree no. 243 in 1996.

O6U is in the 6th of October City, 32 km from downtown Cairo. The campus consists of four education buildings, the teaching hospital, and the hostel for female students, while the central library and male students hostel are 150 meters from the campus.

All the awarded degrees are accredited and validated by the Egyptian Supreme Council of Universities.

O6U is a member of the Association of Arab Universities since 1997 and the Association of African Universities.

Faculties
 Medicine (Accredited by NAQAAE)
 Pharmacy (The first private faculty and the sixth Egyptian pharmaceutical faculty to be accredited by NAQAAE: 2014)  
 Dentistry (Accredited by NAQAAE)
 Applied Medical Sciences (The Biomedical Engineering Department was the first in Egypt to be accredited by NAQAAE)
 Engineering
 Physical Therapy (Accredited by NAQAAE)
 Information Systems & Computer Science (Accredited by NAQAAE)
 Applied Arts (Accredited by NAQAAE)
 Media & Mass Communication
 Economics & Management
 Languages & Translation (accredited by NAQAAE)
 Education
 Social Science
 Tourism & Hotel Management (Accredited by NAQAAE)

Postgraduate studies

An academic cooperation agreement was signed between many government universities and October 6 University (O6U). It was endorsed by the supreme council of national and private universities on June 4, 2011, by which O6U is allowed to offer postgraduate programs in collaboration with Theses Universities and degrees will be granted by them.

October 6 University Hospital
The hospital is built on a surface area of 45,000 square meters. It has a capacity of 360 beds, 20% out of them offer free-of-charge service for education purposes.

Institutes

The university has many institutes of higher education under the name Culture & Science City.

The Culture and Science City has two campuses: the first is in 6 October City and the second is in Sheraton and distributed per the following locations:

6 October Campus 
 Higher Institute of Engineering
 Higher Institute for Mass Media and Communication Techniques
 Higher Institute for Computer Science and Information Systems
 Higher Institute of Languages
 Higher Institute of Administrative Sciences
 Higher Institute of Economics and Environment
 Higher Institute for Social Work

Sheraton Campus
 Higher Institute for Optics Technology
 Egyptian Higher Institute for Tourism and Hotels
 Higher Institute for Languages (Sheraton Buildings)

Library

Six October University Library (SOUL) is considered one of the largest, well–stocked university libraries in Egypt. SOUL is outside the university campus (150 m from it) and is designed to be an integrated and all–embracing cultural complex to support the instructional and research needs of university community and beyond. SOUL learning technology consists of the libraries, academic computing services, center for learning and teaching.

SOUL offers online and offline access to databases, e-books and imprint. It houses thousands of volumes, microfilms, digital collection, multimedia materials, and serial titles.

Notable alumni
 Tamer Hosny, Egyptian singer and actor 
 Karim Zulfikar, Egyptian businessman
 Dina El-Sherbeeny, Egyptian actress
 Amr Yassin, Egyptian screenwriter

See also
 List of Egyptian universities

External links
 o6u.edu.eg October 6 University official website

References 

 
Education in 6th of October (city)
Educational institutions established in 1996
1996 establishments in Egypt
Universities in Egypt
Education in Cairo